Machowski (feminine: Machowska; plural: Machowscy) is a Polish surname. Notable people with the surname include:

Ignacy Machowski (1920–2001), Polish actor
Tiago Machowski (born 1993), Brazilian footballer
Tom Machowski (born 1953), American ice hockey player

See also
 
 Mackowski

Polish-language surnames